Léon Pourtau (1868 – 4 July 1898) was a French painter and musician.

At the age of 15, an apprentice typesetter, Pourtau left Bordeaux for Paris. He worked in a small restaurant on the Rue Lafayette, where musicians gathered Orchestre Lamoureux. Thanks to them Pourtau got a job as a concert clarinetist in a Café-chantant. He toured with a circus band where he would help set up the tent and bathe the elephants. Back in Paris he entered the Conservatoire de Paris. During this period he married, had two children, and become a professor at the Conservatoire de Lyon at the age of 22 – the youngest ever.

He met Georges Seurat, himself also a musician, who taught him the impressionist technique. He took the opportunity of a concert tour in the US, which, after two years, earned him 20,000 Francs. He also became principal clarinetist of the Boston Symphony Orchestra in 1894 at the invitation of conductor Emil Paur. At the annual exhibition of fine art held in Philadelphia over the winter of 1896–1897, he exhibited a painting, Quatre heures de l'après-midi (Four o'clock in the afternoon). This would be his only showing. Returning to Le Havre, Pourtau boarded the SS La Bourgogne. On 4 July 1898 she was sunk in collision in dense fog with the British sailing ship Cromartyshire off Sable Island (now belonging to Canada). The painter died in the accident.

His works are now in the collections of several art museums including the Museo Soumaya, Mexico City and the Phoenix Art Museum, Phoenix, Arizona.

References

External links 
 

1872 births
1898 deaths
Artists from Bordeaux
Conservatoire de Paris alumni
19th-century French painters
French male painters
French classical clarinetists
Post-impressionist painters
Deaths due to shipwreck at sea
19th-century classical musicians
Musicians from Bordeaux
19th-century French male artists